USCGC Valiant (WMEC-621) is a United States Coast Guard multi-mission medium endurance cutter in service since 1967. Valiant is home ported in Jacksonville, Florida and operates in the Atlantic Ocean, Caribbean Sea and Gulf of Mexico for the Commander, Coast Guard Atlantic Area. Missions include search and rescue, maritime law enforcement, marine environmental protection, and national defense operations.

History
USCGC Valiant (WMEC-621) was laid down 28 February 1966 at American Ship Building Company, Lorain, Ohio, United States and launched on 14 January 1967. She is the seventh of sixteen cutters of her class. She was commissioned on 3 November 1967 at Galveston, Texas, her first homeport, where she served for 24 years. 

In November 1991, Valiant was decommissioned for a mid-life overhaul. On January 7, 1994, Valiant was re-commissioned to her second homeport in Miami Beach, Florida.

On August 8, 2012 Valiant arrived at her current homeport at Naval Station Mayport.

Capabilities
Valiant normally carries 12 officers and 63 crewmembers. An important aspect of Valiants design is the attention given to habitability. The ship has its own galley, sickbay; laundry, sewage treatment system, televisions, radios, and digital satellite television.

Valiant is equipped with two controllable-pitch propellers, which makes her highly maneuverable.

Valiant has a 25 mm machine cannon mounted on the bow and is capable of firing high-explosive projectiles at a rate of 180 rounds per minute. In addition, the vessel mounts two .50 caliber heavy machine guns. The 24-foot "Cutter Boat Large" (CBL) and the 23 foot "Over The Horizon" (OTH) are used to visit and board other vessels at sea. The special towing bitt on the fantail allows Valiant to tow vessels up to 10 times her size. Another feature of Valiant is her ability to carry a Coast Guard HH-65 Dolphin helicopter. The helicopter extends the ship's surveillance range for law enforcement and reduces response time for search and rescue mission.

Valiants mission capabilities are greatly enhanced by sophisticated electronic equipment such as: a Global Positioning System, surface search radar with a computerized collision avoidance system, radio direction finders, fathometers, and different types of radios.

Operational history

Valiant played an important role in the 1980 Cuban Boatlift in conjunction with dozens of Coast Guard cutters, small boats, aircraft, and Navy vessels.

On 8 June 1990 the tanker Mega Borg'''s pump room exploded leaving the ship crippled, on fire and leaking oil.

Since 1994, Valiant has been actively engaged in Alien Migration Interdiction Operation (AMIO). Valiant recovered and interdicted over 500 Haitian and Cuban migrants during Operations Able Manner and Able Vigil. Valiant repatriated over 1,900 Haitian migrants from Guantanamo Bay, Cuba to Port au Prince, Haiti over the course of 11 passages.

In 1996, Valiant was Patrol Commander for the Summer Olympic Sailing events in Savannah, Georgia, directing over 29 Coast Guard assets in providing security for 800 athletes from 98 countries. Following the Olympics, Valiant earned an overall excellence award at Refresher Training in Mayport, Florida, with an overall score of 98%. In 1997, Valiant participated in Operation Tradewinds and trained over 500 Caribbean Coast Guard members from 12 countries in damage control, engineering, and seamanship fundamentals.

In January 1999, Valiant escorted the merchant ship Cannes to the coastal waters of Galveston, TX. A boarding team from Valiant helped Law Enforcement Detachment (LEDET) 406 South search Cannes, resulting in the discovery of over 10,000 pounds of cocaine. Next, Valiant sailed to Mayport, Florida, where for the second time in a row the ship earned the Atlantic Area Commander's award for operational readiness at Tailored Ship Training Availability (TSTA) in February 1999.

Just after midnight on 7 November 1999, Valiant discovered a partially submerged vessel with a man on top of the sinking hull and another man floating in the water. The two men had been sailing back to Antigua when their boat started to take on water; soon afterwards a wave had capsized the boat. The two men spent over 30 hours in the water before Valiants crew rescued them.

A USCG LEDET boarding team aboard Northumberland intercepted the motor vessel Adriatik in the vicinity of Barbados. After three days, the boarding team found two and half tons of cocaine. The boarding concluded with the arrest of 13 crewmembers and the seizure of both the vessel and the cocaine.

During the passage of Hurricane Lenny in November 1999, Valiant led search and rescue efforts for two missing sailing vessels in the vicinity of Saba Island. Valiant was the on-scene commander supervising the search efforts of 6 Coast Guard cutters and 29 aircraft assets. Valiant and its crew covered over 1250 miles searching for two missing sailboats. Despite locating over eight overturned and capsized vessels adrift in the area, only one survivor was found.

In 2004, Valiant engaged in alien migration interdiction operations during the 2004 Haiti Rebellion near Port-au-Prince. She repatriated 531 Haitians intercepted on boats as they tried flee the growing violence and turmoil fueled by rebel forces intent on removing President Jean-Bertrand Aristide from power.

On 23 January 2010, Valiant assisted in the humanitarian relief efforts following the 2010 Haiti earthquake.

On 24 September 2019, the Coast Guard reported that Valiant, along with four Colombian naval assets, intercepted a 40' long drug-smuggling semi-submersible carrying 12,000 lbs. of cocaine in the Pacific Ocean. The submersible was spotted by maritime aircraft prior to asking Valiant'' for assistance. The cocaine was estimated to be worth $165 million. Only 1,100 lbs. of the cocaine could be recovered from the submersible before it was sunk due to safety issues. The exact location where the submarine was found was not disclosed. Four men were taken into custody.

References

External links

Valiant home page

Ships of the United States Coast Guard
Reliance-class cutters
1967 ships
2010 Haiti earthquake relief
Ships built in Lorain, Ohio
Historic American Engineering Record in Florida